The Royal Armoured Corps helmet is a combat helmet of British origin worn by Armoured Troops. As with the similarly shaped HSAT, it was initially manufactured by Briggs Motor Bodies at Dagenham. It was introduced in WW2 and was issued to commonwealth countries in the post-1945 era up to the Falklands War. The RAC helmets came with the same suspension and liner from the Brodie helmets and later the elasticated suspension and liner from the MkIII helmet. Many were converted to use as a Paratrooper Helmet.

The Royal Armoured Corps helmet had the same shape, as did the helmets used by dispatch riders.

Users

 Used by Canadian Tankers attached to British Armoured divisions

References

External links

Combat helmets of the United Kingdom
World War II military equipment of the United Kingdom
British Army equipment
Military equipment introduced from 1945 to 1949